Lorenzo Bertini may refer to:
Lorenzo Bertini (rower) (born 1976), Italian rower
Lorenzo Bertini (footballer) (born 2001), Italian footballer